Charles Somerset may refer to:

Charles Somerset, 1st Earl of Worcester (1460 – 1526), 1st Earl of Worcester and husband of Henry VIII's mistress, Elizabeth Browne
Charles Somerset (MP for Monmouthshire) (died 1599), MP for Monmouthshire (UK Parliament constituency)
Charles Somerset, Marquess of Worcester (1660 – 1698), eldest son of Henry Somerset, 1st Duke of Beaufort
Charles Somerset, 4th Duke of Beaufort (1709 – 1756), younger son of Henry Somerset, 2nd Duke of Beaufort
General Lord Charles Somerset (1767–1831), second son of the 5th Duke of Beaufort, was governor of the Cape Colony, South Africa from 1814 to 1826.